Sturisoma rostratum is a species of armored catfish endemic to Brazil.

References
 

Sturisoma
Fish of South America
Fish of Brazil
Endemic fauna of Brazil
Fish described in 1829